Paravisión, sometimes known as Canal 5, is a Paraguayan free-to-air television channel owned by Albavisión which broadcasts news programs, sports, entertainment, imported TV shows, among others. It also employs the European Teletext system.

It is available on DTT in the capital city of Asunción, broadcasting on UHF channel 19 (or virtual channel 19.1)
since September 2018.

External links 
  

Television stations in Paraguay
Television channels and stations established in 2004
Spanish-language television stations